Webb Chiles (born 1941), born Webb Tedford, is an American sailor and author noted for his offshore sailing. He has completed six circumnavigations, several of them single-handed, and is the author of seven books.

Early life

Webb Chiles was born in 1941 in St. Louis, Missouri and moved to California in 1963.

Sailing

First Circumnavigation
Leaving in October 1975 from San Diego, he set the record for the fastest solo circumnavigation in his Ericson 37 Egregious, with an eastwards passage around the three capes in 203 days. In this journey he also became the first American to round Cape Horn solo.

Subsequent circumnavigations
 1978–1984 
 1984–1990
 1991–2003
 2008–2009
 2014–2019 in Gannet, a  Moore 24

Published works
 Chiles, Webb. A Single Wave: Stories of Storms and Survival. Sheridan House, 1999. 
 Chiles, Webb. Return to the Sea. Sheridan House, 2004. 
 Chiles, Webb. Shadows. Amazon, 2011. 
 Chiles, Webb. Storm Passage: Alone around Cape Horn. Times Books, 1977. 
 Chiles, Webb. THE FIFTH CIRCLE: the Passage Log. Amazon, 2011. 
 Chiles, Webb. The Ocean Waits. Norton, 1984. 
 Chiles, Webb. The Open Boat: Across the Pacific. Norton, 1982.

Recognition
Cruising Club of America, Bluewater Medal 2017 

Ocean Cruising Club Jester Medal 2014

Photos

See also
Single-handed sailing

References

American sailors
Circumnavigators of the globe
Writers from St. Louis
1941 births
Living people